The men's doubles event at the 2018 South American Games was held from 29 May to 2 June.

Medalists

Draw

References

External links
Draw

Men's doubles